Donya is a feminine given name. Notable people with the name include:

Given name
 Donya Aziz, Pakistani politician
 Donya Fannizadeh (1967–2016), Iranian puppeteer
 Donya Feuer (1934–2011), American dancer
 Donya Salomon-Ali (born 1993), Canadian-born Haitian footballer 
 Donya Tesoro (born 1992), Filipina politician

Fictional characters
Donya, one of the major characters in the 2017 movie Tehran Taboo

Feminine given names